The 2023 Manly Warringah Sea Eagles season will be the 74th in the clubs history since their entry to the New South Wales Rugby League premiership in 1947. The coach will be Anthony Seibold taking over from Des Hasler. Daly Cherry-Evans will captain the club for the seventh consecutive year. The Sea Eagles won the inaugural pre-season challenge

Des Hasler Situation 
As a result of not making the finals, a requirement under Des Hasler's contract the Sea Eagles the contract would not able to automatically extend to the end of 2024. Initially the situation started out with a change in assistant coaches with Chad Randall and Michael Monaghan leaving the club. It upset Hasler, but after meetings everything was reported that everyone was happy before reports came out that Hasler would coach the club until the end of 2024, with a succession plan in place, which put the club in unrest. 

A month later in October 2022, Des Hasler announced he threatened to sue Manly over the Manly pride jersey player boycott, as he believed that it derailed the season as a result of how there was  little communication given between the playing group, coaching staff and the management about what was going on. By then Manly powerbrokers already identified Anthony Seibold as a potential successor to Hasler, with Hasler identifying Josh Hannay as his preferred successor. Emails were also leaked between Manly officials involving the pride jersey.  It was then reported that if he is to coach Manly in 2023, he would have no say in recruitment/retention, accept Seibold as his successor and accept that 2023 would be his last year.  

On the 13th of October 2022, Hasler was sacked from the club.  On the 8th of November 2022, Seibold was officially announced as the head coach for the Sea Eagles.

2023 Squad

Transfers 

Re-Signed: Josh Aloiai (2025), Daly Cherry-Evans (2025), Toluta'u Koula (2024), Karl Lawton (2024), Ben Trbojevic (2024), Kaeo Weekes (2023)

Results 

Pre-Season Challenge

Source: 

Regular Season 

Source:

Representative Players 

 Austin Dias ( Māori All Stars)
 Morgan Harper ( Māori All Stars)

References 

Manly Warringah Sea Eagles seasons